Nelmes is an English surname. 

From the old English meaning,  "near the elms".

Notable persons with this name include:
Alan Nelmes (born 1948), English footballer
Alf Nelmes (1871–1940), English footballer
Lemuel Dole Nelme (c. 1718 – 1786), English craftsman and language theorist
Nuatali Nelmes, Australian politician

English-language surnames